Pradeep Mohanraj (born 11 November 1990) is an Indian footballer who currently plays for Delhi Dynamos in the Indian Super League.

Career

Chirag United Kerala
The 2011-12 football year got off to a good start for Pradeep as he made his debut for Chirag United Club Kerala in the 2011 Indian Federation Cup against Prayag United.

Air India
After failing to help Chirag United Kerala out of relegation Mohanraj signed for Air India FC who also play in the I-League and on 26 August 2012 made his debut for the club during the 2012 Durand Cup against Delhi United FC and even scored his first goal for the club and his career in the 18th minute as Air India went on to win the match 3–0. He then scored his second goal for the club on 30 August 2012 in the Semi-Finals of the 2012 Durand Cup against SESA Football Academy in the 55th minute; Air India went on to win the match 7–6 on penalties after the match finished 2–2 after regulation time. Then on 1 September 2012 Mohanraj won his first professional tournament of his career when Air India won against Dodsal F.C. 3–2 on penalties in the final of the 2012 Durand Cup; Mohanraj scored one of the penalties for Air India. Mohanraj then scored a brace for Air India on 4 November 2012 but this time in the professional I-League against ONGC F.C. at the Ambedkar Stadium in which Mohanraj scored in the 3rd and 14th minute of the match which led Air India to a 4–2 victory.

Career statistics

Club
Statistics accurate as of 12 May 2013

Honours
Air India
 Durand Cup (1): 2012

References

Indian footballers
1990 births
Living people
People from Ooty
Footballers from Tamil Nadu
I-League players
Chirag United Club Kerala players
Air India FC players
Mumbai Tigers FC players
Mumbai FC players
Association football midfielders
Ozone FC players
I-League 2nd Division players
Indian Super League players
Odisha FC players